Marvast District was formerly Khatam County, Yazd province, Iran. At the 2006 National Census, its population was 12,773 in 3,374 households. The following census in 2011 counted 13,948 people in 3,823 households. At the latest census in 2016, the district had 15,150 inhabitants in 4,518 households. After the census, the district was raised to the status of Marvast County and split into two districts: the Central District and Isar District.

References 

Khatam County

Districts of Yazd Province

Populated places in Yazd Province

Populated places in Khatam County